Samantha C. Noble (born 15 May 1984) is an Australian actress who has worked on television series and films. She is best known for her role as Jade/Amitiel in Gabriel, and has appeared in several films including See No Evil and Court of Lonely Royals.

Biography

Personal life
Noble was born in Adelaide, South Australia. She is the oldest of two children. Her younger sibling is Dan Noble (an entrepreneur). Their parents are renowned actor John Noble and Penny Noble - who owns a Yoga school. Noble attended Brigidine College Randwick, (Sydney). She completed her master's degree at Sydney University in 2004 and decided after graduation that she wanted to be an actress. In 2001, Noble graduated with a BA in drama, history and education from the Australian Catholic University and she has trained at NIDA, the Actors Studio in New York, the Stella Adler Institute in Los Angeles, Ivana Chubbick Studio, On Camera Connections and ATYP. She teaches acting at several film schools in Sydney and Los Angeles. She plays the piano, guitar and saxophone, and resides in Austin, Texas, with her two children.

Career
Noble is the face of Fosters Lager in America. She has starred in several TV series including Home and Away and All Saints, and played the role of Leah in the 2008 release of the horror/thriller movie The Gates of Hell. She has also starred in See No Evil and Gabriel. She was shortlisted to co-host the American version of Gladiators and the Ben Stiller film The Heartbreak Kid. Noble has also appeared in several short films including Taxi Ride, How To Hurt, Lost Little Girl and Dead Man's Creek. She guest starred in an episode of Fringe in its fourth season along with her father, John Noble, who was a regular cast member of the show.

Filmography

References

External links

1984 births
Living people
Australian film actresses
Australian television actresses
University of Sydney alumni
Actresses from Adelaide
Actors Studio alumni